Lilly Kilvert (born 1950) is an American production designer. She has been nominated for two Academy Awards in the category Best Art Direction.

Selected filmography
 Legends of the Fall (1994)
 The Last Samurai (2003)

References

External links

1950 births
Living people
American production designers
Artists from Providence, Rhode Island